Kirsten Caroline Dunst (born April 30, 1982) is an American actress. She made her acting debut in the short Oedipus Wrecks directed by Woody Allen in the anthology film New York Stories (1989). She then gained recognition for her role as child vampiress Claudia in the horror film Interview with the Vampire (1994), which earned her a Golden Globe nomination for Best Supporting Actress. She also had roles in her youth in Little Women (1994) and the fantasy films Jumanji (1995) and Small Soldiers (1998).

In the late 1990s, Dunst transitioned to leading roles in a number of teen films, including the satires Dick and Drop Dead Gorgeous and the Sofia Coppola-directed drama The Virgin Suicides (all in 1999). In 2000, she starred in the lead role in the cheerleading film Bring It On, which has become a cult classic. She gained further wide attention for her role as Mary Jane Watson in Sam Raimi's Spider-Man trilogy (2002–2007). Her career progressed with a supporting role in Eternal Sunshine of the Spotless Mind (2004), followed by a lead role in Cameron Crowe's tragicomedy Elizabethtown (2005), and as the title character in Coppola's Marie Antoinette (2006).

In 2011, Dunst starred as a depressed newlywed in Lars von Trier's apocalyptic film drama Melancholia, which earned her the Cannes Film Festival Award for Best Actress. In 2015, she played Peggy Blumquist in the second season of the FX series Fargo, which earned Dunst a Primetime Emmy Award nomination. She then had a supporting role in the film Hidden Figures (2016), and leading roles in The Beguiled (2017) and the black comedy series On Becoming a God in Central Florida (2019), for which she received a third Golden Globe nomination. She earned nominations for her fourth Golden Globe and first Academy Award nomination for her performance in the psychological drama The Power of the Dog (2021).

Early life and family
Dunst was born on April 30, 1982, at Point Pleasant Hospital in Point Pleasant, New Jersey. Dunst's father worked for Siemens as a medical services executive, and her mother worked for Lufthansa as a flight attendant. She was also an artist and one-time gallery owner. Dunst's father is German, originally from Hamburg, and her American mother is of German and Swedish descent. Until age eleven, Dunst lived in Brick Township, New Jersey, and attended Ranney School in Tinton Falls.

In 1993, she moved to Los Angeles with her mother and brother, after her parents separated. She began acting while a student at Notre Dame High School, and continued doing so after graduating in 2000. In her teens, she found it difficult to cope with her rising fame, and for a period she blamed her mother for pushing her into acting as a child. However, she later said that her mother "always had the best intentions". When asked if she had any regrets about her childhood, Dunst said, "Well, it's not a natural way to grow up, but it's the way I grew up and I wouldn't change it. I have my stuff to work out... I don't think anybody can sit around and say, 'My life is more screwed up than yours.' Everybody has their issues".

Acting career

Early work (1988–1993) 
Dunst began her career at age three as a child fashion model in television commercials. She was signed with Ford Models and Elite Model Management. In 1988, she appeared in Saturday Night Live as the granddaughter of George H. W. Bush. Later that year, she made her feature film debut with a minor role in Woody Allen's short film Oedipus Wrecks; it was released as one-third of the anthology film New York Stories (1989). Soon after, Dunst performed in the comedy-drama The Bonfire of the Vanities (1990), based on Tom Wolfe's novel of the same name, in which she played the daughter of Tom Hanks' character. In 1993, Dunst made a guest appearance in an episode of the science fiction drama Star Trek: The Next Generation.

Breakthrough (1994–2001) 
Dunst's breakthrough role came in 1994, in the horror drama Interview with the Vampire opposite Tom Cruise and Brad Pitt, based on Anne Rice's novel of the same name. She played Claudia, the child vampire who is a surrogate daughter to Cruise's and Pitt's characters. The film included a scene in which Dunst shared her first onscreen kiss with Pitt, who is nearly two decades her senior. She stated that kissing him had made her feel uncomfortable: "I thought it was gross, that Brad had cooties. I mean, I was 10," she recalled. While the film overall received mixed reviews, many critics singled out Dunst's performance for acclaim. Roger Ebert considered her portrayal of Claudia to be one of the "creepier" aspects of the film, and took note of how well she had conveyed the impression of great age inside apparent youth. Todd McCarthy of Variety stated that Dunst was "just right" for the family. For her performance, she won the MTV Movie Award for Best Breakthrough Performance and the Saturn Award for Best Young Actress, in addition to receiving a Golden Globe Award nomination for Best Supporting Actress.

Later in 1994, Dunst co-starred in the drama film Little Women alongside Winona Ryder and Claire Danes. The film was critically acclaimed. Janet Maslin of The New York Times hailed it as the greatest adaptation of Louisa May Alcott's novel of the same name and wrote of Dunst's performance:

In 1995, Dunst starred in the fantasy adventure film Jumanji, a loose adaptation of Chris Van Allsburg's 1981 children's book of the same name. The story is about a supernatural and ominous board game in which animals and other jungle hazards appear with each roll of the dice. She was part of an ensemble cast that included Robin Williams, Bonnie Hunt and David Alan Grier. The film was a financial success and grossed $262 million worldwide. In that year, and again in 2002, Dunst was named one of People magazine's 50 Most Beautiful People.

From 1996 to 1997, Dunst had a recurring role in season three of the NBC medical drama ER. She played Charlie Chemingo, a child prostitute who was being cared for by the ER pediatrician Dr. Doug Ross (George Clooney). In 1997, she voiced Young Anastasia in the animated musical film Anastasia. Also in 1997, Dunst appeared in the black comedy film Wag the Dog, opposite Robert De Niro and Dustin Hoffman. The following year she voiced the title character, Kiki, a thirteen-year-old apprentice witch who leaves her home village to spend a year on her own, in the anime Kiki's Delivery Service. She also starred in Sarah Kernochan's period comedy All I Wanna Do (1998), playing a student at an all girls' boarding school in the 1960s, opposite Gaby Hoffmann, Rachael Leigh Cook, and Lynn Redgrave. Writing for The New York Times, A. O. Scott opined that "the film is surprisingly pleasant, thanks to smart, unstereotyped performances – especially by Hoffmann and Dunst – and the filmmaker's evident respect and affection for her characters".

Dunst starred in Drop Dead Gorgeous, a 1999 American satirical black comedy mockumentary film about a small town beauty pageant with Ellen Barkin and Allison Janney. She turned down the role of Angela Hayes (played by Mena Suvari) in American Beauty (1999), because she did not want to appear in the film's sexual scenes or kiss the lead character, played by Kevin Spacey. She later explained: "When I read it, I was 15 and I don't think I was mature enough to understand the script's material." Dunst co-starred in the comedy film Dick, opposite Michelle Williams; it is a parody which retells the events of the Watergate scandal that led to the resignation of former United States president Richard Nixon. Her next film was Sofia Coppola's drama The Virgin Suicides (1999), based on Jeffrey Eugenides' novel of the same name. She played Lux Lisbon, one of the troubled teenage daughters of Ronald Lisbon (James Woods). The film was screened as a special presentation at the 43rd San Francisco International Film Festival in 2000. According to Metacritic, the film received generally favorable reviews. San Francisco Chronicle critic Peter Stack noted in his review that Dunst "beautifully balances innocence and wantonness". Dunst also appeared in Savage Garden's music video "I Knew I Loved You", the first single from their second and final album Affirmation (1999).

In 2000, Dunst starred in the comedy Bring It On as Torrance Shipman, the captain of a cheerleading squad. The film garnered mostly positive reviews, with many critics reserving praise for her performance. In his review, A. O. Scott called her "a terrific comic actress, largely because of her great expressive range, and the nimbleness with which she can shift from anxiety to aggression to genuine hurt". Charles Taylor of Salon noted that "among contemporary teenage actresses, Dunst has become the sunniest imaginable parodist", even though he thought the film had failed to provide her with as good a role as she had in either Dick or in The Virgin Suicides. Jessica Winter of The Village Voice praised Dunst, stating that her performance was "as sprightly and knowingly daft as her turn in Dick" adding that "[Dunst] provides the only major element of Bring It On that plays as tweaking parody rather than slick, strident, body-slam churlishness." Peter Stack of the San Francisco Chronicle, despite giving the film an unfavorable review, commended Dunst for her willingness "to be as silly and cloyingly agreeable as it takes to get through a slapdash film".

The following year, Dunst starred in the comedy film Get Over It. She later explained that she took the role for the opportunity to showcase her singing. Also in 2001, she starred in the historical drama The Cat's Meow, directed by Peter Bogdanovich, as actress Marion Davies. Derek Elley of Variety described the film as "playful and sporty", deeming this Dunst's best performance to date: "Believable as both a spoiled ingenue and a lover to two very different men, Dunst endows a potentially lightweight character with considerable depth and sympathy". For her performance, she won the Best Actress Silver Ombú award at the 2002 Mar del Plata International Film Festival.

Stardom with Spider-Man and comedies (2002–2009) 
In 2002, Dunst starred opposite Tobey Maguire in the superhero film Spider-Man, the most financially successful film of her career up until this date. She played Mary Jane Watson, the best friend and love interest of Peter Parker (Maguire). The film was directed by Sam Raimi. Owen Gleiberman of Entertainment Weekly noted Dunst's ability to "lend even the smallest line a tickle of flirtatious music". Writing for the Los Angeles Times, Kenneth Turan reviewed that Dunst and Maguire made a real connection onscreen, concluding that their relationship "involved audiences to an extent rarely seen in films". Spider-Man was a critical and commercial success. The film grossed $114 million during its opening weekend in North America and earned $822 million worldwide.

Dunst next co-starred with Billy Bob Thornton, Morgan Freeman and Holly Hunter in the drama Levity (2003), a story of a man who is released on parole and returns to his hometown seeking redemption. That same year, she co-starred opposite Julia Roberts, Maggie Gyllenhaal and Julia Stiles in the drama Mona Lisa Smile (2003). The film received mostly negative reviews, with Manohla Dargis of the Los Angeles Times describing it as "smug and reductive". Dunst co-starred as Mary Svevo opposite Jim Carrey, Kate Winslet and Tom Wilkinson in Michel Gondry's science fiction romantic comedy-drama Eternal Sunshine of the Spotless Mind (2004). The latter film was critically acclaimed, with Entertainment Weekly describing Dunst's subplot as "nifty and clever". The film grossed $72 million worldwide.

The success of the first Spider-Man led Dunst to reprise her role as Mary Jane Watson in 2004 in Spider-Man 2. The film was acclaimed by critics and a commercial success, setting a new opening weekend box office record for North America. With box office revenues of $783 million worldwide, it was the second highest-grossing film in 2004. Also in 2004, Dunst co-starred opposite Paul Bettany in the romantic comedy Wimbledon in which she portrayed a rising tennis player in the Wimbledon Championships, while Bettany portrayed a fading former tennis star. The film received mixed reviews, but many critics enjoyed Dunst's performance. Claudia Puig of USA Today observed that the chemistry between Dunst and Bettany was potent, with Dunst doing a "fine job as a sassy and self-assured player". 
In Dunst's sole project of 2005, she co-starred opposite Orlando Bloom in Cameron Crowe's romantic tragicomedy Elizabethtown as flight attendant Claire Colburn. The film premiered at the 2005 Toronto International Film Festival. Dunst revealed that working with Crowe was enjoyable, but more demanding than she had expected. The film garnered mixed reviews, with the Chicago Tribune rating it 1 out of 4 stars and describing Dunst's portrayal of a flight attendant as "cloying". It was also a box office disappointment. After Elizabethtown, Dunst collaborated with Sofia Coppola again and starred as the title character in the historical drama Marie Antoinette (2006), based on Antonia Fraser's book Marie Antoinette: The Journey. The film was screened at a special presentation at the 2006 Cannes Film Festival, and was reviewed favorably. The film grossed $60 million at the box office from a budget of $40 million.

In 2007, Dunst reprised the role of Mary Jane Watson in Spider-Man 3. In contrast to its predecessors' rave reviews, Spider-Man 3 received a mixed reaction from critics. Ryan Gilbey of the New Statesman was critical of Dunst's character, remarking that "the film-makers couldn't come up with much for Mary Jane to do other than scream a lot". Nevertheless, with a worldwide gross of $891 million, it stands as the most commercially successful film in the series and Dunst's highest-grossing film to the end of 2008. Having initially signed on for three Spider-Man films, she said she would consider doing a fourth, but only if Raimi and Maguire returned. In January 2010, it was announced that the fourth film was canceled and that the Spider-Man film series would be restarted, therefore dropping the trio from the franchise.

Dunst's next role was in 2008, in which she co-starred opposite Simon Pegg in the comedy How to Lose Friends & Alienate People, based on former Vanity Fair contributing editor Toby Young's memoir of the same name. Review aggregator Rotten Tomatoes gave the film an approval rating of 37%, with the film gaining mostly negative reviews. Robert Wilonsky of The Village Voice was critical of Dunst's performance, writing she "seems to be speaking in four different accents at once, none of them quite of the English variety". He added that the film "plays like a made-for-CBS redo of The Devil Wears Prada".

Independent films, television work and dramas (2010–2016) 
Dunst made her screenwriting and directorial debut with the short film Bastard, which premiered at the Tribeca Film Festival in 2010 and was later featured at the 2010 Cannes Film Festival. She co-starred opposite Ryan Gosling in the mystery drama All Good Things (2010), based on the true story of New York real estate developer Robert Durst, whose wife disappeared in 1982. The film received fair reviews, but was a commercial failure, earning only $640,000 worldwide. The critic Roger Ebert praised Dunst for her ability to capture "a woman at a loss to understand who her husband really is, and what the true nature of his family involves". The San Francisco Chronicle complimented her performance as "the only one worth watching", despite the film's "slow crawl" and lack of suspense. Also in 2010, Dunst co-starred with Brian Geraghty in Carlos Cuarón's short film The Second Bakery Attack, based on Haruki Murakami's short story.

In 2011, Dunst co-starred opposite Charlotte Gainsbourg, Kiefer Sutherland and Charlotte Rampling in Lars von Trier's drama film Melancholia as a woman suffering depression as the world ends. It premiered at the 2011 Cannes Film Festival and received positive reviews, in particular for Dunst's performance. Steven Loeb of Southampton Patch wrote "This film has brought the best out of von Trier, as well as his star. Dunst is so good in this film, playing a character unlike any other she has ever attempted... Even if the film itself were not the incredible work of art that it is, Dunst's performance alone would be incentive enough to recommend it". Sukhdev Sandhu of The Daily Telegraph wrote "Dunst is exceptional, so utterly convincing in the lead role – trouble, serene, a fierce savant – that it feels like a career breakthrough. Dunst won several awards for her performance, including the Best Actress Award at the Cannes Film Festival and the Best Actress Award from the U.S. National Society of Film Critics.

Dunst made a cameo in Beastie Boys' 2011 music video Fight For Your Right Revisited which premiered at the Sundance Film Festival. A year later, she starred in Juan Diego Solanas' science fiction romance Upside Down with Jim Sturgess. Described as a Romeo and Juliet story, Peter Howell of the Toronto Star opined that there was no character development and Dunst "brings competence but no passion to her underwritten roles". The film's consensus on Rotten Tomatoes was also negative, with a 28% approval rating. Next, she had a role in Leslye Headland's romantic comedy Bachelorette (2012), starring Isla Fisher, Rebel Wilson and Lizzy Caplan; the film was produced by Will Ferrell and Adam McKay. Dunst plays Regan Crawford, one of three women who reunite for the wedding of a friend who was ridiculed in high school. The film garnered mixed reviews; New York Posts Sara Stewart thought Dunst and Caplan gave strong performances, and praised the writing despite it being "a little underwhelming" on the laughs. Dunst's appeared in the drama On the Road (2012), an adaptation of Jack Kerouac's novel of the same name, in which she plays Camille Moriarty. Dunst was first approached for the role by director Walter Salles several years prior. The film premiered at the 2012 Cannes Film Festival, and was released in the United States on December 21, 2012. On the Road gained mixed reviews and under-performed at the box office. Writing for Time magazine, Richard Corliss compared On the Road to "a diorama in a Kerouac museum ... [the film] lacks the novel’s exuberant syncopation", but praises Dunst's performance. Chicago Tribunes Michael Phillips was more positive, giving the film 3 out of 4 stars, praising the cinematic quality, and actors for their "kind of fluid motion and freedom that periodically makes On the Road make sense and makes it feel alive".

Hossein Amini's The Two Faces of January (2014) was Dunst's next major role, starring alongside Viggo Mortensen and Oscar Isaac. Playing Colette MacFarland, the wife of a con artist, the thriller is based on Patricia Highsmith's 1964 novel of the same name. Garnering mostly favorable reviews, the Los Angeles Times complimented the 1960s Greek setting and observed Dunst "brings a potent complexity to Colette; every mood shift registers to the bone". Jake Wilson of The Sydney Morning Herald praised the script for "condensing the book's plot while retaining its spirit", although he thought there was some uneven editing. Of Dunst's performance, he called her "typically teasing yet sympathetic". Finally in 2014, Dunst voiced a character in the eighth episode of Cosmos: A Spacetime Odyssey, and made a guest appearance in an episode of Portlandia. Throughout 2015, Dunst focused solely on television work. She was cast as hairdresser Peggy Blumquist in the second season of the critically acclaimed FX crime comedy-drama Fargo, which earned her a nomination for Golden Globe Award for Best Actress.

In 2016, Dunst co-starred in Jeff Nichols' science fiction drama Midnight Special with Michael Shannon and Joel Edgerton. The story is about a father and his eight-year-old son who go on the run upon discovering that the boy possesses mysterious powers. The film opened to mostly positive reviews; Tim Grierson of The New Republic was impressed by Midnight Specials special effects which imitated a late 20th century retro style. However, he questioned the purpose of Dunst's character which "simply has nothing to do". Dunst had a supporting role in the biographical drama Hidden Figures (2016), a loose adaptation of the book of the same name, about African-American mathematicians who worked at the National Aeronautics and Space Administration (NASA) during the Space Race. Dunst's portrayal of a white supervisor drew praise from Slant Magazines Elise Nakhnikian, while The Guardian thought the film was educational and entertaining despite its underdeveloped supporting cast. The film was a commercial success, grossing $236 million worldwide and was nominated for three Academy Awards. The cast also won the Screen Actors Guild Award for Outstanding Performance by a Cast in a Motion Picture. In addition to acting, Dunst served as a member of the main competition jury of the 2016 Cannes Film Festival. In that year, Dunst planned to direct an adaptation of Sylvia Plath's novel The Bell Jar, starring Dakota Fanning, but stepped down from the project before production.

2017–present: Awards recognition 
Dunst had two film releases in 2017. She starred alongside Colin Farrell, Nicole Kidman and Elle Fanning in the drama The Beguiled, which marked her third collaboration with Sofia Coppola, who wrote and directed the film. It is a remake of Don Siegel's 1971 film of the same name about a wounded Union soldier who seeks shelter at an all-girls' school in the Confederate States of America. Rotten Tomatoes gave the film a 79% approval rating which was "enlivened by strong performances from the cast". Matthew Norman of the Evening Standard similarly took note of the "impeccable" acting performances and wrote, "Dunst lends the ideal measure of coiled physical longing to her prim spinster".

Dunst then starred in the psychological thriller Woodshock, written and directed by her friends, Kate and Laura Mulleavy, founders of the Rodarte fashion label. The film is about a woman who falls deeper into paranoia after taking a deadly drug. The Mulleavys' personally approached Dunst for the lead role, which gave Dunst an "emotional safety net" during filming. She prepared for the role over the course of a year, undertaking dream experiments in order to try to inhabit the character's state of mind. Upon release, the film was unpopular with critics. Katie Rife of The A.V. Club acknowledged the "sophisticated" cinematography but thought "Character development and motivation are practically nonexistent, and the already-thin plot pushes ambiguity to the point of incoherence". Varietys Guy Lodge shared a similar opinion with the character, writing "Dunst has form in playing irretrievably inverted depression to riveting effect, but the Mulleavys’ script hardly gives her as complex an emotional or intellectual palette to work with".

In 2019, Dunst starred in the Showtime dark comedy television series On Becoming a God in Central Florida, which premiered in August that year. For her role, she was nominated for a Golden Globe for Best Actress and a Critics Choice Award for Best Actress in a Comedy Series. In September 2019, Showtime renewed the series for a second season, but ultimately canceled it the following year due to the COVID-19 pandemic.

Dunst co-starred with her partner Jesse Plemons in Jane Campion's film The Power of the Dog distributed by Netflix, and given a limited theatrical release in the USA on 17 November 2021. She received Academy Award and Golden Globe Award nominations for Best Supporting Actress.

Music career
Dunst made her singing debut in the comedy film Get Over It, performing two songs written by Marc Shaiman.

She recorded Henry Creamer and Turner Layton's jazz standard "After You've Gone" that was used in the end credits of The Cat's Meow. In Spider-Man 3, she sang two songs as Mary Jane Watson, one during a Broadway performance, and one as a singing waitress in a jazz club. Dunst recorded the songs earlier and lip-synced while filming. She appeared in the music videos for Savage Garden's "I Knew I Loved You", Beastie Boys' "Make Some Noise" and R.E.M.'s "We All Go Back to Where We Belong" and she sang two tracks which were "This Old Machine" and "Summer Day" on Jason Schwartzman's 2007 solo album Nighttiming. In 2007, Dunst said she had no intention to release albums, saying, "It worked when Barbra Streisand was doing it, but now it's a little cheesy, I think. It works better when singers are in movies".

Dunst starred as the magical princess Majokko in the Takashi Murakami and McG directed short Akihabara Majokko Princess singing a cover of The Vapors' 1980 song "Turning Japanese". This was shown at the "Pop Life" exhibition in London's Tate Modern museum from October 1, 2009, to January 17, 2010. It shows Dunst dancing around Akihabara, a shopping district in Tokyo, Japan.

Personal life

In 2001, Dunst purchased a house in Toluca Lake, California, selling it in September 2019 for $4.5 million. In 2010, she sold a property in Nichols Canyon, California, for $1.4 million. Dunst owned a Lower Manhattan apartment which she listed for sale in 2017.

In early 2008, Dunst was treated for depression at the Cirque Lodge treatment center in Utah. In late March 2008, she left the treatment center and began filming All Good Things. Two months later, she went public with this information in order to dispel rumors of drug and alcohol abuse, stating, "Now that I'm feeling stronger, I was prepared to say something. [...] Depression is pretty serious and should not be gossiped about".

Relationships 
Dunst began dating actor Jake Gyllenhaal in 2002, after the two were introduced by Gyllenhaal's sister and Dunst's Mona Lisa Smile co-star, Maggie Gyllenhaal. The two shared a Los Angeles home before breaking up in 2004, reportedly on friendly terms. She was in a relationship with her On the Road co-star Garrett Hedlund from 2012 to 2016; they were briefly engaged before eventually breaking up.

She began a relationship with her Fargo co-star Jesse Plemons in 2016 and they became engaged in 2017. Their first son was born in May 2018. In a cover shoot for W directed by long-time collaborator Sofia Coppola, she announced that she was pregnant with her second child, and later gave birth to their second son in May 2021. Dunst and Plemons were married in July 2022.

Other ventures
Dunst supports the Elizabeth Glaser Pediatric AIDS Foundation, for which she helped design and promote a necklace whose sales proceeds went to the Foundation. She worked in support of breast cancer awareness, participating in the Stand Up to Cancer telethon in September 2008 in order to raise funds for cancer research. On December 5, 2009, she participated in the Teletón in Mexico, in order to raise awareness for cancer treatment and children's rehabilitation.

Dunst endorsed John Kerry in the 2004 presidential election. She supported Barack Obama during the 2008 presidential election, and directed and narrated a documentary, Why Tuesday, about the tradition of voting on Tuesdays and low voter turnout in the United States, to "influence people in a positive way". She endorsed Bernie Sanders in the 2020 presidential election. In 2011, she acquired German citizenship, which enabled her to "film in Europe without a problem". She now holds dual American and German citizenship.

Acting credits and awards

Dunst's most acclaimed films according to the review aggregate site Rotten Tomatoes, include Little Women (1994), Spider-Man (2002), Spider-Man 2 (2004), Eternal Sunshine of the Spotless Mind (2004), Melancholia (2011), The Two Faces of January (2014), Hidden Figures (2017), and The Power Of The Dog (2021).

Dunst has been nominated for four Golden Globe awards: Best Supporting Actress for Interview with the Vampire (1994) and The Power of the Dog, Best Actress for Miniseries or Television Film for Fargo (2015), and Best Actress for Television Series Musical or Comedy for On Becoming a God in Central Florida (2019). In August 2019, she received a star on the Hollywood Walk of Fame. Dunst was nominated for Best Actress in a Supporting Role for The Power of The Dog in the 2022 Academy Awards.

Discography

References

External links

 
 
 

1982 births
20th-century American actresses
21st-century American actresses
Actresses from New Jersey
American child actresses
American child models
American feminists
American film actresses
American people of German descent
American people of Swedish descent
American television actresses
American video game actresses
American voice actresses
Audiobook narrators
Cannes Film Festival Award for Best Actress winners
Citizens of Germany through descent
Female models from New Jersey
Singers from New Jersey
HIV/AIDS activists
Living people
New Jersey Democrats
Notre Dame High School (Sherman Oaks, California) alumni
Outstanding Performance by a Cast in a Motion Picture Screen Actors Guild Award winners
People from Brick Township, New Jersey
People from Point Pleasant, New Jersey
Ranney School alumni